Neodymium(III) iodide is an inorganic salt of iodine and neodymium the formula NdI3. Neodymium uses the +3 oxidation state in the compound. The anydrous compound is a green powdery solid at room temperature.

Preparation

Heating neodymium and iodine in an inert atmosphere produces a salt:

Heat the nonahydrate with ammonium iodide to prevent hydrolysis:

Physical Properties

Neodymium(III) iodide forms green, water-soluble hygroscopic crystals. It has a melting point of 784°C. It forms a nonahydrate crystal NdI3.9H2O – belongs to the orthorhombic crystal system, space group Pmmn, lattice constants a = 1.16604 nm, b = 0.80103 nm, c = 0.89702 nm, Z = 4.

Other compounds
NdI3 also forms some compounds with N2H4, such as NdI3·3N2H4·2H2O which is a dark green crystal, soluble in methanol and ethanol and insoluble in water, benzene and toluene, d20°C = 3.42 g/cm³.

NdI3 also forms some compounds with urea, such as NdI3 5CO(NH2)2 which is a lavender color crystal.

NdI3 also forms some compounds with thiourea, such as NdI3·2CS(NH2)2·9H2O which is a pale pink crystal.

See also
 Neodymium(II) iodide
 Neodymium
 Iodine
 Lanthanide

References 

Neodymium compounds
Iodides
Lanthanide halides